Marta Puda (born 13 January 1991) is a Polish sabre fencer.

References 

1991 births
Living people
Polish female sabre fencers
Fencers at the 2016 Summer Olympics
Olympic fencers of Poland
People from Będzin
Sportspeople from Silesian Voivodeship
21st-century Polish women